Craig Malcolm Ferguson (born April 8, 1970) is an American former professional ice hockey player. He played 27 games in the National Hockey League with the Montreal Canadiens, Calgary Flames, and Florida Panthers between 1993 and 1999. He later spent several seasons playing in the Swiss Nationalliga A and Deutsche Eishockey Liga, and retired in 2006. Ferguson was drafted by the Canadiens in the seventh round, 146th overall in the 1989 NHL Entry Draft.

Playing career

Collegiate
After graduating from Riverview Rural High School in 1988, Ferguson played four years of college hockey for the Yale University Bulldogs of the ECAC. At Yale, Ferguson lived at Calhoun College. Ferguson was one of the twelve players named to the 1988–1989 ECAC Hockey All-Rookie team. Ferguson graduated from Yale with a BA in economics and political science. He returned to New Haven in 1997–1998 as a member of the Beast of New Haven. During the season, he became the first professional hockey player invited to speak at a Master's Tea at Calhoun College; past speakers had included James Earl Jones and Paul Newman.

Professional
He was drafted in 1989 and turned pro in 1992. He spent much of his career bouncing around the minor leagues, but appeared in 27 National Hockey League games for the Canadiens, Calgary Flames and Florida Panthers. Ferguson recorded one goal (against the Toronto Maple Leafs in Mario Tremblay's first game as coach) and one assist in his NHL career. In 2000, he moved to Europe where he played three seasons for HC Fribourg-Gottéron in the Swiss Nationalliga A, and three with ERC Ingolstadt in the German Deutsche Eishockey Liga.

Personal
Ferguson's father is former NHL player Norm Ferguson. Born in Castro Valley, California to Canadian parents, Ferguson was raised in Sydney, Nova Scotia.

Ferguson and his family later lived in Orlando, Florida.

Career statistics

Regular season and playoffs

Awards and honors

References

External links

1970 births
Living people
American men's ice hockey centers
Beast of New Haven players
Calgary Flames players
Canadian people of Scottish descent
Carolina Monarchs players
ERC Ingolstadt players
Florida Panthers players
Fredericton Canadiens players
HC Fribourg-Gottéron players
Ice hockey players from California
Louisville Panthers players
Montreal Canadiens draft picks
Montreal Canadiens players
People from Castro Valley, California
Phoenix Roadrunners (IHL) players
Saint John Flames players
Sportspeople from Castro Valley, California
Wheeling Thunderbirds players
Yale Bulldogs men's ice hockey players